The Philippine sailfin lizard (Hydrosaurus pustulatus), also known as crested lizard, sail-fin lizard, sailfin water lizard, soa-soa water lizard or its native name ibid, is an oviparous lizard endemic to several of the islands that make up the Philippines and is also found in New Guinea and some parts of eastern Indonesia. The Philippine Sailfin Lizard is a protected species in its native country of the Philippines as it is a target for exotic pet collectors and sought after in the international pet trade. This is largely because these lizards have unique dorsal crests (otherwise known as sailfins) that give the organism a structure similar to a sail, and the Philippine sailfin lizard also has very bright coloration patterns that make them attractive to the eye. The pustulatus species is unique within the Hydrosaurus genus because of the confusion for the past several decades of classifying these organisms amongst other lizards within their same genus in their habitat. They are also very talented swimmers, and smaller juvenile lizards can run on top of water due to their bodily structure. The genus Hydrosaurus means water dragon, which reflects the aforementioned abilities lizards have in water. The Philippine sailfin lizard usually lies close to bodies of water, stays in tree branches, and runs across the ground to get around their habitat. They utilize their sailfins/scales to do territorial displays in the presence of a competitor or a predator. In terms of their reproduction, they utilize sexual reproduction and breed one time each year, but they can produce multiple clutches of eggs with between 2 and 8 eggs. These eggs are buried into the soil for a period of two months before hatchlings are produced. Philippine sailfin lizards are heavily studied by herpetologists and other scientists, as they are unique amongst other reptile lizards with regard to their coloration and form.

History and taxonomy
In 1829, Johann Friedrich von Eschscholtz discovered a new sailfin lizard species in the Philippines and designated it as Hydrosaurus pustulatus. The genus Hydrosaurus is specific to Southeast Asia, and it only contains three major species (with two additional species falling under H. amboinensis): H. amboinensis, H. pulsatus, and H. weberi. The Philippine sailfin lizard and the genus Hydrosaurus is also commonly referred to as a water dragon due to their excellent ability to swim in and sometimes run across water. There have been issues with the taxonomic identification of Hydrosaurus pustulatus because the original descriptions were of immature members of the  species in the 1800’s and were not descriptive enough for diagnostic procedures in environmental studies. As a result, efforts for understanding the spread of different taxonomic groupings have been a challenge.

Habitat and distribution
The Philippine sailfin lizard is found across several of the islands that comprise the Philippines, including Guimaras, Romblon, Negros, and Cebu, but the lizard is not found in Palawan Island. The lizard is also found in New Guinea and some of eastern Indonesia. The Philippine sailfin lizard lives in tropical wooded habitats near water, like rivers, riverbanks, rice-fields and mangrove. The Philippine sailfin lizard also lives in moderately high densities in these habitats. The Philippine sailfin lizard also prefers the bodies of water that they reside nearby being freshwater. Due to confusion with H. amboinensis, the exact distribution in the Philippines has been labelled with some uncertainty. However, a genetic study that sampled individuals throughout the Philippine archipelago (from Mindanao in south to Luzon in north) found that all were H. pustulatus, which is divided into six clades. Additionally, the Philiippine sailfin lizard is often found near rocky areas close to a stream.

Behavior and appearance 
In terms of the physical characteristics, Philippine sailfin lizards are large and usually grow to a length between two and three feet, including its tail, but males are larger than females and can grow up to between 3 and 4 feet long (91 - 120 centimeters). These lizards typically weigh between 3 and 5 pounds (1.4 - 2.3 kg). Additionally, this species of lizard has a unique characteristic being its crest or sailfin, which is an upright part of its body that occurs from the base of the tail to the lower area of the back. This crest or sailfin is used not only to help with its ability to swim efficiently in water, but is also thought to assist with the lizard's ability to do territorial displays and heat/cool in different environments. The crest also makes the Philippine sailfin lizard’s body look like a sail with regard to its structure. Overall, the body and tail of the Philippine sailfin lizard is largely cylindrical.  The juvenile Philippine sailfin lizard is an excellent swimmer and has flattened toes along with smaller mass compared to adults that enable it to run across water, similar to the basilisks. The adult Philippine sailfin lizard does not usually retain a smaller mass and loses the ability to run across water, but it uses these flattened toes to swim very effectively. The flattened toes also have scale fringes that can be used for swimming and running on top of water as mentioned before. Males have a larger crest on their back than the females. The males also have bigger heads, taller sails on their tails, and darker limbs. During mating season, the head of the Philippine sailfin lizard becomes violet while only the neck area of a female’s crest can become violet. In terms of coloration, Philippine sailfin lizards have dark green and brown skin, and can also have yellow patches on the back side of their body and near their heads. The Philippine sailfin lizard has a flattened tail that is used to propel in water more quickly, adding to its natural born ability to be agile and swift in water to evade prey. In the presence of predators, the Philippine sailfin lizard either drops from the tree branch it is residing on, runs, or swims to the bottom of the body of water it is closest to and can hold its breath for up to 15 minutes. Philippine sailfin lizards are also diurnal and spend most of the day time resting in vegetation out in the sun. In general, the Philippine sailfin lizard utilizes running to move around its habitats and away or toward predators and competitors, and their lifespan can be anywhere between 10 and 20 years. The Philippine sailfin lizard also has a unique physical feature being a vestigial eye (which is also known as parietal or pineal eye) on the top of the lizard's skull that can detect differing angles of light from the sun and is thought to be used to find a sense of direction.

Life cycle and reproduction
Philippine sailfin lizards reproduce through sexual reproduction, and they only breed once every year with potentially multiple clutches of eggs. In order for female Philippine sailfin lizards to lay their eggs after mating and birth, they dig relatively shallow holes in soil near their watery-habitats, and these eggs then incubate for approximately two months. The eggs then eventually become hatchlings during the rainy season, which actually are born with a natural swiftness and agility that allows them to evade their predators by running across the water unlike adult lizards that swim. These female Philippine sailfin lizards are able to lay several clutches of eggs a year that each can contain anywhere between 2 and 8 eggs. It's also important to note that these eggs are laid above the flood line.

Conservation
Philippine sailfin lizards have now been classified as least concern by the IUCN. Their main threats are habitat loss, being hunted for food, and collection for the pet trade. The factors contributing to this vulnerable conservation status include habitat loss, hunting by exotic meat collectors and the pet trade. It is currently illegal according to Philippine law to export the lizard out of the country, but some exotic pet collectors claim to already be in possession of these lizards and breed them in captivity to sell them to buyers in the United States of America. In fact, the median price for these lizards is $700, which is considerably more expensive than other lizards. Some of the most well known trading centers for the Philippine sailfin lizards are 1) Puerto Princesa City, Palawan Island, 2) Cebu City, Cebu Island, and 3) Davao City, Mindanao Island. It’s essential that conservation efforts to create protected areas within the Philippines for the Philippine sailfin lizard are within the habitats that they normally live in and not these trading areas. In terms of the history of the pet trade, Philippine sailfin lizards were sold in higher frequency between  1980 and 1990 because the Philippines as a country was exporting them internationally, but they now do not export these lizards anymore, leaving Indonesia to be the primary source of exporting them.

Diet
The Philippine sailfin lizards are omnivores and they eat plants including leaves and fruits in addition to insects and crustaceans. Juvenile Philippine sailfin lizards start out preferring meat more than plants, but the balance comes as they age. Their diet is easy to replicate, which is why they are a target for exotic pet collectors, but they’re not as docile compared to other lizards. The Philippine sailfin lizard’s omnivorous diet is also reflected by its relatively simple dental complexity, specifically with the posterior teeth of the mouth having less defined tricuspid teeth and the posterior teeth being tricuspid. As a result, the lizard cannot primarily be a carnivore since its teeth were not designed to do so.

In captivity
In terms of keeping a Philippine sailfin lizard in captivity, they are typically kept in large enclosures with tropical-styled heating, semi-arboreal resources, access to submerging in water to mimic their natural environment. Breeding in captivity has only been done in a few cases, but this explanation has also been used as a method of smuggling the Philippine sailfin lizards out of their native habitats for sale. Since it is common in many parts of the Philippines, the pet trade in many regions still continues and some are even unrecognized by the government. It’s also important to note that the Philippine sailfin lizards are to be approached with caution when held captive as they are extremely nervous and can scratch people, but studies have shown that hand-feeding these lizards helps them become less nervous and gain trust.

Gallery

References

External links

Hydrosaurus
Reptiles of the Philippines
Reptiles described in 1829
Endemic fauna of the Philippines
Taxa named by Johann Friedrich von Eschscholtz